Giorgos Gasparis (1913–1978) was a Greek professional footballer who played as a defender.

Club career

Gasparis started football in 1927 at Ethnikos Kaisarianis and in 1930 he moved to Apollon Athens. In 1935 AEK Athens wanted to sign him, but since Apollon did not give him, he went to AEK Piraeus for a year and in 1936 he joined AEK Athens, remaining until 1950, where he retired from the at the age of 37. During his 14-year presence in the club, he was a key player in the defense of the team helping them win 2 conscecutive Panhellenic Championships, 3 Greek Cups and 4 Athens FCA League, including the first domestic double by a Greek club in 1939.

International career
Gasparis played with Greece 5 times, with both Apollon and AEK Athens. His debut took place in the matches for the 5th Balkan Cup in Sofia in June 1935 against Bulgaria and Romania. He also played in a friendly against Egypt in Cairo in June 1936 and in both qualification matches for the 1938 FIFA World Cup. against Palestine.

Managerial career
Completing his football career, Gasparis became a coach and was on the bench of several clubs, while in 1973 he worked as an assistant coach of Billy Bingham in Greece.

Honours

AEK Athens
Panhellenic Championship: 1938–39, 1939–40
Greek Cup: 1938–39, 1948–49, 1949–50
Athens FCA League: 1940, 1946, 1947, 1950

References

External links

1913 births
1978 deaths
Greek footballers
Greece international footballers
Association football defenders
Ethnikos Asteras F.C. players
Apollon Smyrnis F.C. players
AEK Athens F.C. players
Smyrniote Greeks
Emigrants from the Ottoman Empire to Greece
Footballers from İzmir